Seaton Creek is a small tributary of Slippery Rock Creek in western Pennsylvania.  The stream rises in northern Butler County and flows southwest entering Slippery Rock Creek near Boyers, Pennsylvania. The watershed is roughly 26% agricultural, 68% forested and the rest is other uses.

See also 
 List of rivers of Pennsylvania

References

Rivers of Pennsylvania
Tributaries of the Beaver River
Rivers of Butler County, Pennsylvania